Tori Dam is an under construction dam located about  east of Qalat, Afghanistan, which is the capital of Zabul Province. Construction of the Dam is estimated to cost 97 million afghanis.

Tori Dam is 70 metres wide and 25 metres long. After completion, it will irrigate 600 acres of land. It will also be able to produce 100 kilowatts of electricity and hold 2.9 million cubic metres of drinking water.

See also
 List of dams and reservoirs in Afghanistan

References

Dams in Afghanistan
2022 establishments in Afghanistan